Armenian folk music is a genre of Armenian music. It usually uses the duduk, the kemenche, and the oud.  It is very similar to folk music in the Caucasus and shares many similar songs and traditions with countries around Armenia, namely Georgia and Azerbaijan.

References

Armenian music
Folk music by country